Niobium(V) iodide is the inorganic compound with the formula Nb2I10. Its name comes from the compound's empirical formula, NbI5.  It is a diamagnetic, yellow solid that hydrolyses readily.  The compound adopts an edge-shared bioctahedral structure, which means that two NbI5 units are joined by a pair of iodide bridges. There is no bond between the Nb centres.  Niobium(V) chloride, niobium(V) bromide, tantalum(V) chloride, tantalum(V) bromide, and tantalum(V) iodide, all share this structural motif.

Synthesis and structure
Niobium pentaiodide forms from the reaction of niobium with iodine:  
2 Nb + 5 I2  →  2 NbI5
The method used for the preparation of tantalum(V) iodide using aluminium triiodide fails to produce pure pentaiodide.

References

Iodides
Niobium(V) compounds
Metal halides